Building 20 (18 Vassar Street, Cambridge, Massachusetts) was a temporary timber structure hastily erected during World War II on the central campus of the Massachusetts Institute of Technology. Since it was always regarded as "temporary", it never received a formal name throughout its 55-year existence. (Many major buildings at MIT are known by their numbers regardless of how neoclassical or otherwise permanent they may be.)

The three-floor structure originally housed the Radiation Laboratory (or "Rad Lab"), where  fundamental advances were made in physical electronics, electromagnetic properties of matter, microwave physics, and microwave communication principles, and which has been called one of America's "two prominent shrines of the triumph of science during the war" (along with the desert installation at Los Alamos, where the atomic bomb was born). A former Rad Lab member said, "At one time, more than 20 percent of the physicists in the United States (including nine Nobel Prize winners) had worked in that building".

After the Rad Lab shut down after the end of World War II, Building 20 served as a "magical incubator" for many small MIT programs, research, and student activities for a half-century before it was demolished in 1998.

Structure
The building was hurriedly constructed in 1943 as part of the emergency war research effort; however, it continued to be used until shortly before its demolition in 1998, making it one of the longest-surviving World War II temporary structures on campus. The building had the overall shape of an extended mirror-reversed "F", with multiple parallel "wings" connected to a longer spine which paralleled Vassar Street. The spine of the "F" (wing B) was slightly skewed compared to the projecting wings, because of the gradual divergence of Vassar Street compared to Memorial Drive, which runs parallel to the Charles River Basin. 

The three-floor structure was framed with large wooden posts and beams, supporting massive floor planks which creaked and groaned underfoot. The structure was extremely sturdy, but it complained continually under its burden of heavy equipment and material. The ground level floor was concrete slab.  Over time, the interior walls became a hodgepodge of Transite, Masonite, and gypsum wallboard as various occupants grew, shrank, or repurposed their spaces.

The roof was flat, covered in tar paper and gravel, and emitted radiant heat into the top floor whenever the sun shone.  The outer sheathing consisted of asbestos-cement shingles painted a dirty white in a vain attempt to  reduce solar heat load.  The windows were leaky, rattling wooden sash, and bristled with numerous large window-mounted air conditioners, since the interior spaces would otherwise become unbearably hot during warm weather.

Wings A, B, and C were built first, in a Π shape. The later wings were assigned the letters D, E, and F. Although there was no basement, the ground floor was inexplicably assigned room numbers beginning with  "0", underscoring complaints of some occupants that the first floor corridors looked like a basement. The idiosyncratic floor numbering required the second floor to use "1", and the third floor to use "2", a confusing exception to the usual logical MIT scheme for assigning room numbers (although the same as floor numbering in Britain). Thus, a typical room number might be "20B-119", located in Wing B, on the second floor. Parts of the building were wired with 230V electricity (as in Britain), as well as 110V.

There was little provision to admit daylight to the narrow interior corridors, which were dimly lit even as summer heat baked them.  Heat  and humidity released a distinctive "old familiar musty odor" recalled by an occupant years later.  Opening a windowless corridor door would disclose a blaze of light, or a dark gloomy space, depending on the occupancy of the room.  In warm weather, the constant drone of large fans and air conditioners dominated all other sounds.

The outdoors spaces between the wings accommodated an assortment of rusty equipment and storage tanks, picnic tables, unidentified junk, and drill spaces used by ROTC students.  At various times, chain link fence was installed or removed, especially during times of student unrest in the late 1960s and early 1970s.

Origins
Building 20 was originally referred to by one of the architects, George McCreery of McCreery & Theriault, as the "Building 22 Annex". The Rad Lab had started in MIT Building 4, then had a radome constructed on Building 6, then expanded to Building 24 (erected in 1941), and to Building 22 (completed in May 1942). Building 20, completed in December 1943, was part of the continued rapid expansion of the Rad Lab on the MIT campus.  McCreery noted that the building was designed and constructed "as a war measure, the life of said building to be for the duration of the war and six months thereafter".

In 1945, as the Rad Lab prepared to close down, these temporary buildings were not taken down immediately, since post-war student enrollments were increasing dramatically and more space was still needed. Building 22 was remade into a temporary dormitory, which housed 600 students by 1947.  Building 20 continued to be used for machine shops, research labs, and offices. Building 22  was later demolished, to make room for Building 26 (the Karl Taylor Compton Laboratories).  , Building 24 still stands, as the sole surviving structure from the WWII period, still being used for labs, offices, and classrooms.

Occupants
Due to Building 20's origins as a temporary structure, researchers and other occupants felt free to modify their environment at will.  As described by MIT professor Paul Penfield, "Its 'temporary nature' permitted its occupants to abuse it in ways that would not be tolerated in a permanent building. If you wanted to run a wire from one lab to another, you didn't ask anybody's permission — you just got out a screwdriver and poked a hole through the wall." Many building occupants were unaware of the presence of asbestos.

Institute Professor Emeritus Morris Halle commented that the abundance of space in Building 20 meant that "many quite risky projects got off the ground. Linguistics, my field, was one such risky project. But for the existence of Building 20, it would not have been developed at MIT."  Noam Chomsky pioneered modern linguistics and generative grammar in a "shabby" nondescript-looking "miserable hole" of an office in Building 20 for several decades.

MIT professor Jerome Y. Lettvin once quipped, "You might regard it as the womb of the Institute. It is kind of messy, but by God it is procreative!"

Because of its various inconveniences, Building 20 was never considered to be prime space, in spite of its location in the central campus.  As a result, Building 20 served as an "incubator" for all sorts of start-up or experimental research, teaching, or student groups on  a crowded campus where space was (and remains) at a premium. The experimental Concourse teaching group, the Integrated Studies Program (ISP), and the High School Studies Program (HSSP) all found initial homes here.  Some of the early work of the Educational Research Center (ERC) and the Physical Science Study Committee (PSSC), which reformed teaching of high school physics in the post-Sputnik years, was started here. The closing of the ERC was followed by the establishment of the Division for Study and Research in Education (DSRE). Coordinated by Benson R. Snyder, Donald A. Schon, and Seymour Papert, the DSRE was an innovative interdisciplinary center for “learning about learning” at the individual, institutional and societal levels, and made significant contributions to the development of the field of cognitive science.

Building 20 was the home of  the Tech Model Railroad Club, where many aspects of what later became the hacker culture developed.  Around 1973, the MIT Electronic Research Society (MITERS) was founded there, as an early student-run hackerspace.  Building 20 also housed one of the first anechoic chambers, where research was performed by acoustics pioneer Leo Beranek.  Professor Amar Bose did his early research on loudspeakers here, eventually leading to the founding of Bose Corporation. Prolific analog circuit designer and technical writer Jim Williams had an electronics lab here for a decade, before moving on to National Semiconductor and then Linear Technology. The Strobe Lab of high-speed photography trailblazer Harold "Doc" Edgerton was located here for many years, although the facility was relocated to Building 4 before the final years of Building 20.

Professor Rainer Weiss’ group was housed in Building 20 from the 1970s until the building was torn down. Balloon-lifted packages to measure the cosmic microwave background, and the Cosmic Background Explorer (COBE) satellite’s FIRAS instrument and its analysis all had homes there. The LIGO gravitational-wave antenna project was also germinated in Building 20, with prototypes of various detectors built, as well as the writing of the Blue Book which was the first thorough study to build a gravitational-wave antenna. Many of the leaders of the gravitational-wave field did their early work in the F Wing of the building.

In the last half of the 1980s, Building 20 became home to the Biological Process Engineering Center, a prestigious National Science Foundation Engineering Research Center run by Institute Professor Daniel I.C. Wang.  Building 20 also was the home of the MIT Linguistics section, which became the Department of Linguistics and Philosophy in 1976, and the Anthropology section of the Humanities Department.

The innovative MIT Undergraduate Research Opportunities Program (UROP), the MIT Council for the Arts, and the predecessor to the Environmental Health and Safety (EHS) Office were among the assorted administrative offices that sheltered in Building 20.  Here also was the home of Reserve Officers' Training Corps (ROTC) offices and facilities.  After Harvard University shut down its own ROTC program in 1969, its students who wished to join such a program shared facilities with MIT's ongoing ROTC program in Building 20.  Students from Boston University (BU) also came to Building 20 for ROTC training.

Dean of the MIT School of Architecture and Planning William J. Mitchell later acknowledged the influence of Building 20 on the design of the new Stata Center which was to replace it, saying "People didn't love this building for its beauty or its comfort, but for its flexibility. What we learned from Building 20's success was that we would need to provide modern services and technology without being rigid or constraining."

Demolition

Building 20 was gradually emptied in 1996-1998, and demolished to make way for the Ray and Maria Stata Center (Building 32).  Demolition may have been slowed by the need to relocate the many small research, administrative, and student groups located there, plus the special precautions needed to safely dispose of asbestos, lead paint, and PCBs found throughout the World War II vintage structure.   Some of its previous occupants moved into the new Stata Center upon its completion, while other "Building 20 refugees" moved to Building N51/N52 or permanently dispersed to other locations on campus.

On March 27, 1998, "The Magic Incubator", an all-day farewell celebration, was held in honor of Building 20, its former occupants, and the feats accomplished therein.  Professor Jerry Lettvin published an "Elegy for Building 20" to mark the occasion.

In addition, a time capsule box was prepared, which is now displayed in the new Stata Center which was erected on the site.  The time capsule along with several large informational panels about the history of Building 20 are located on the first floor of the Stata Center, near the Dreyfoos Tower elevators, and may be viewed by visitors during normal office hours.

In its final years, Building 20 and its demise were marked by some farewell hacks (student pranks).  In March 1998, a large red banner appeared bearing the words "MASS. INST. OF TECH. — DEACTIVATED — PROPERTY OFFICE", mimicking the stickers the MIT Property Office affixes to obsolete equipment removed from inventory tracking in preparation for surplus disposal. In April 1999, a full-sized elevator shaft enclosure was placed amidst the rubble of the just-demolished Building 20, with a floor indicator including levels "G" and "B1" through "B5", implying the elevator traveled to previously-concealed secret lab space below the ground floor of Building 20. In the years since, there has been a persistent joke on campus that the old Building 20 is still standing, but concealed by an invisibility cloaking field.

See also
 Campus of the Massachusetts Institute of Technology
 Jim Williams

References

Further reading 
 "A Last, Loving Look at an MIT Landmark -- Building 20", RLE Undercurrents, v.9, n.2, Fall 1997, MIT.
 Lehrer, Jonah — "Groupthink: the brainstorming myth"; The New Yorker; January 30, 2012 — An article comparing the allegedly counterproductive technique of "brainstorming" with the historical productivity of informal "idea incubator" environments, using MIT's Building 20 as an example
 Brand, Stewart — How buildings learn: what happens after they're built; 1995; Penguin Books; New York;

External links 
 Building 20 - MIT Museum website
 MIT's Building 20: The Magical Incubator (1998) - MIT TechTV

 Celebrating the History of Building 20 - MIT Libraries site

1943 establishments in Massachusetts
1998 disestablishments in Massachusetts
School buildings completed in 1943
Demolished buildings and structures in Massachusetts
Demolished school buildings and structures in the United States
Massachusetts Institute of Technology
University and college academic buildings in the United States
Buildings and structures demolished in 1998